The UNESCO King Hamad Bin Isa Al-Khalifa Prize for the Use of Information and Communication Technologies (ICT) in Education is a UNESCO prize which rewards projects and programmes of individuals, institutions, other entities or non-governmental organizations for the creative use of information and communication technologies to enhance learning, teaching and overall education performance.

The prize is funded by the Government of the Kingdom of Bahrain and established in 2005. The prize is conferred annually to two laureates. The Director General of UNESCO selects the two laureates based on the recommendation of an independent international jury. The jury consists of five independent members who are recognized figures in the field of ICT in education selected with equitable geographical distribution and gender. They are appointed by the Director-General for a period of two years.

Every year, the prize has a specific theme and the prize awards USD 25,000 to each laureate as well as a diploma during a ceremony at the UNESCO Headquarters in Paris. Nominations for the prize can be submitted by Governments of the Member States of UNESCO via National Commissions or an international non-governmental organization (NGO) in official partnership with UNESCO; self-nominations are not accepted.

Prize winners

2019 - The use of Artificial Intelligence (AI) to innovate education, teaching and learning 

 Letrus Writing Skills Program, Letrus, Brazil
 Dytective, Spain

2018 - The use of ICT to ensure education for the most vulnerable groups 

 ThingLink visual learning technology, ThingLink, Finland
 Can’t Wait to Learn, War Child Holland, the Netherlands

2017 - The Use of ICTs to Increase Access to Quality Education 

 CLIx (The Connected Learning Initiative), India
 GENIE, Morocco

2016 - The Use of ICTs in Education for Disadvantaged Groups 

 “Harnessing the Power of ICTs in Higher Education for Refugees” of Kiron Open Higher Education, Germany
 “Online School” of Jaago Foundation, Bangladesh

2015 - Pedagogical Innovation in the Use of ICTs in Teaching and Learning 

 “National Program of Educational Informatics” (PRONIE) of the Omar Dengo Foundation, Costa Rica
 Open Source Physics @ Singapore project of the Ministry of Education of the Republic of Singapore

2011 - Education Youth for Responsible Global Citizenship 

 Internet-ABC, Germany
 Dr Yuhyun Park, Co-Founder and CEO of iZ HERO, Republic of Korea

2010 - Digital Literacy: Preparing Adult Learners for Lifelong Learning and Flexible Employment 

 National Institute of Continuing Adult Education (NIACE), United Kingdom
 Venezuelan Fundación Infocentro, Bolivarian Republic of Venezuela

2009 - Teaching, learning and e-Pedagogy: Teacher Professional Development for Knowledge Societies 

 Alexei Semenov, Rector of the Moscow Institute of Open Education, Russian Federation
 Jordan Education Initiative, Jordan

2008 - Digital Opportunities for All: Preparing Students for 21st Century Skills 

 Shanghai TV University, People's Republic of China
 Dr Hoda Baraka, First Deputy to the Minister of Communications and Information Technology, Egypt

2007 - Open Education 

 Curriki, United States of America 
 Claroline Connect, Belgium

2006 - Enhancing Teaching and Learning 

 The Cyber Home Learning System (CHLS) for primary and secondary students, the Korean Ministry of Education and Human Resources Development (MOEHRD) and the Korea Education and Research Information Service (KERIS), Republic of Korea 
 EDegree Programme, Kemi-Tornio University of Applied Sciences, Finland

References 

UNESCO awards
Awards established in 2005
Bahraini awards
2005 establishments in Bahrain
Education awards
Science communication awards